Ospel is a village in the Netherlands. It is located in Limburg near Weert, lying between Nederweert and Meijel, close to National Park De Groote Peel. Ospel has been settled since 1864 as a centre for bog harvesting. Once a year in the first weekend of May it is the centre for blues fans; the Moulin Blues Festival attracts thousands of blues fans from all over Europe. At the end of June is Ospel's kermis - a great time to visit with a lot of live music and a great atmosphere.
Ospel is better known as "Ossa" with the local youth.

Schooling
Ospel has a primary school. Ospel does not have a high school. Teenagers are required to attend schools in nearby cities, such as Weert,  from Ospel.

Nearby cities

Gallery

References

Populated places in Limburg (Netherlands)
Nederweert